Diadegma compressum is a wasp first described by Cresson in 1864.
No subspecies are listed.

References

compressum
Insects described in 1864